Leeds is a surname of English origin. It is likely derived from the city of Leeds in West Yorkshire or the village of Leeds in Kent.

Notable people with the surname include:

Alan Leeds (born 1947), American music executive
Alfred Nicholson Leeds (1847–1917), English amateur paleontologist
Andrea Leeds (1914–1984), American film actor
Andrew Leeds (born 1964), Australian rugby footballer
Anthony Leeds (1925–1989), American anthropologist
Billy Leeds (1880–1955), Australian rules footballer
Charles J. Leeds, American politician, Mayor of New Orleans 1874–76
Doug Leeds (born 1968), American businessman
Douglas B. Leeds (1947–2011), American businessman
Edward Leeds (priest) (died 1590), English clergyman
Edward Thurlow Leeds (1877–1955), English archaeologist, Keeper of the Ashmolean Museum 1928–45
Eric Leeds (born 1952), American musician
Herbert I. Leeds (1900–1954), American film director
Herbert Leeds (1855–1930), American amateur golfer and golf course architect
Joanie Leeds (born 1978), American musician
Lila Leeds (1928–1999), American film actor
Morris E. Leeds (1869–1952), American electrical engineer
Peter Leeds (1917–1996), Americana actor
Peter Leeds (financial analyst), American financial analyst
Phil Leeds (1916–1998), American film actor
Stacy Leeds (born 1971), American law professor
Thelma Leeds (1910–2006), American actor
Titan Leeds (1699–1738), American almanac publisher

Fictional characters
Ned Leeds, comic book character

See also
 which may include people not yet added to the list above
Leeds (disambiguation)

References